Ichthyococcus are a genus of lightfishes. It is one of seven genera in the family Phosichthyidae.

Included species
There are currently seven recognized species in this genus:
 Ichthyococcus australis Mukhacheva, 1980 (Southern lightfish)
 Ichthyococcus elongatus S. Imai, 1941 (Slim lightfish)
 Ichthyococcus intermedius Mukhacheva, 1980 (Intermediate lightfish)
 Ichthyococcus irregularis Rechnitzer & J. E. Böhlke, 1958 (Bulldog lightfish)
 Ichthyococcus ovatus (Cocco, 1838) (Lightfish)
 Ichthyococcus parini Mukhacheva, 1980
 Ichthyococcus polli Blache, 1963

References

 
Marine fish genera
Ray-finned fish genera
Taxa named by Charles Lucien Bonaparte